Drunvalo Melchizedek (born: Bernard Perona, also formerly known as AKBAR and Hummingbird) is an esoteric researcher. He has authored four books and founded several schools of New Age teaching, such as the School of Remembering. He was formerly associated with the Seed Of Life Institute.

History and personal life 

Melchizedek was born  in Alameda, California as Bernard Donald Perona to Charles Perona and Minnie Ashton. He changed his name legally in 1991, although claims that the persona of Melchizedek arrived in 1972.

Melchizedek has attended the University of California Berkeley, acquiring a Bachelor of Fine Arts degree. In addition, he has claimed to have studied physics and mathematics, even though there is no evidence of that and he holds no credentials in any of those fields. He is however a lifelong researcher, he lived among shamans and indigenous peoples. Drunvalo deeply researched ancient history and culture.

Melchizedek lives in Sedona, Arizona, with his wife, Claudette (née Koleta), married 1994.

Claims 

Melchizedek's claims are broad and varied, but some aspects of it are more prominent. Common elements involve Hindu meditation, Christianity and other Abrahamic religions and offshoots, particularly Kabbalah.

Sacred Geometry, or Flower of Life 

Sacred Geometry is the belief that fundamental properties of the universe can be quantified into simple shapes and patterns. According to Melchizedek, the ability to see these patterns has been hidden, until the time for modern technology to aid further human evolution and consciousness exploration.

The core of this geometry is a grid of overlapping circles known as the Flower of Life.

Merkaba 

Merkaba or Mer-Ka-Ba, variously said to be an Egyptian term or a Zulu term (but resembles the Hebrew word for "chariot" which is associated with Merkabah mysticism), is a supposed invisible, metaphysical energy field that surrounds the human body, consisting of tetrahedrons that rotate around the body. A slowly rotating merkaba is considered negative. Modern-day humans, it is said, have had their merkabas slowed to a stop, and with the "right" meditation, their merkaba can be restored, allowing ascension to a higher state of being, which Melchizedek claims to have already achieved.

Merkaba energy is supposedly detectable by man-made technology, such as by military satellites, and is claimed to have been used in various secret government programs.

Criticisms 

Boxing Pythagoras, a critical metaphysics blog, dismisses Drunvalo's notions of "sacred geometry", pointing out that there is nothing geometrical about it:

Boxing Pythagoras also calls out Melchizedek's use of math: "For a book which is purported to be focused primarily on geometry, I found surprisingly little mathematical information." Boxing Pythagoras points out errors in Melchizedek's definition of transcendental number, sine wave, and golden spiral, and calls out the use of various geometrical tautologies as meaningful and a number of unsubstantiated number theories.

Dan Winter's website, now owned by competing spiritualist Stan Tenen due to a legal settlement, hosts a collection of correspondence detailing a dispute between Melchizedek, Tenen, and Winter about plagiarizing each other's works. Tenen suggested Winter had plagiarized him, and Melchizedek asserted that a drawing in Winter's book was in fact his own. Tenen, however, asserts that both Melchizedek and Winter were working together and both continuing to plagiarize Tenen. Animosity between Tenen and the two remain.

Like other New Age and other spiritual mystics in the early 2010s, Melchizedek has been criticized for his adoption and promotion of the 2012 phenomenon. According to Melchizedek, the Earth's kundalini was scheduled to shift for the first time in 13,000 years, which would have occurred in 2012. Competing spiritualist Jeremy Puma likewise criticizes Melchizedek's 2012 predictions.

New Age follower-turned-critic Christopher Zzenn Loren attacks Melchizedek for his use of what Loren calls "hypnotic suggestion" and "confusing language" to influence the viewer. "He makes excuses for incorrect information and blames it on being human." In his personal interactions with Melchizedek while being a follower, Zzenn Loren believes Melchizedek made claims about his abilities, but then carefully avoided demonstrating them for him:

Buffalo Calf Woman, follower of another spiritualist, David Running Eagle, attacks Melchizedek as "fraudulent", and disregards him as an adherent to the Order Of Melchizedek due to his commercialism and profit:

Similarly, the Manataka American Indian Council asserts that Melchizedek, in his associations with Adam DeArmon and his Institute for Cultural Awareness, commits cultural appropriation of Native American spirituality, with no authentic tie to such cultures, and exploits them for profit under the auspices of fundraising:

References in popular culture 

The Tool song "Forty Six & 2" refers to Melchizedek's claim that once all humanity has restored their merkaba, the human race will evolve into a higher stage, in which the human race will acquire two additional chromosomes.

Willow Smith's extended play release 3 explores mystical concepts inspired by Melchizedek.

Brent Bolthouse lists Drunvalo's work among his workspace accoutrements.

Merkabah Gallery in Manguinhos, Brazil, is named from Melchizedek's claims.

Bibliography 
 
 
 
 
 
  With Daniel Mitel.

Discography

Filmography

As presenter or narrator 
 Story of England, 1993 (DVD)
 Through The Eyes of a Child – Awakening the Way of a Child Within Us, 2008 (DVD)
 Mayan Mysteries, 2008 (DVD)
 2012 – The Prophecies from the Heart, 2010 (DVD)
 The Birth of a New Humanity, 2011 (Series)
 Earth/Sky/Heart Workshop, 2015 (Video)
 Flower of Life, 2016 (Series)
 Earth Sky / Living in the Heart (DVD, Japanese)

References 

1941 births
Living people
American male writers
Esotericists
New Age spiritual leaders
21st-century mystics
People from Alameda, California
People from Sedona, Arizona